Paul Antony John Dancy (born 26 September 1978) is an English cricketer.  Dancy is a right-handed batsman who bowls right-arm medium-fast.  He was born in Farnborough, London.

Dancy represented the Middlesex Cricket Board in a single List A match against Scotland in the 1st round of the 2002 Cheltenham & Gloucester Trophy which was held in 2001.  In his only List A match he scored a single run and with the ball he took a single wicket at a cost of 39 runs.

He currently plays club cricket for Teddington Cricket Club in the Middlesex County Cricket League.

References

External links
Paul Dancy at Cricinfo
Paul Dancy at CricketArchive

1978 births
Living people
People from Farnborough, London
Cricketers from Greater London
English cricketers
Middlesex Cricket Board cricketers